The APRA Music Awards are several annual and two-yearly award ceremonies run in New Zealand by Australasian Performing Right Association to recognise songwriting skills, sales and airplay performance by its members. APRA hold the annual Silver Scroll Awards and song awards, selects an inductee into the New Zealand Music Hall of Fame, and makes three professional development awards every second year. APRA also runs awards for its Australian members.

APRA Silver Scroll Awards 

Each year all songwriters that are members of APRA with a song on general release in the eligibility period can enter the APRA Silver Scroll Award. For the APRA Silver Scroll Award, a judging panel of APRA members decides a shortlist of songs, which is then voted on by APRA's wider membership of 10,000+ songwriters and composers. The votes of the wider APRA membership decide the winner and finalists for the APRA Silver Scroll Award. The APRA Silver Scroll Award is awarded purely on the basis of songwriting.

Silver Scroll award
Silver Scroll winners are announced annually.

Sounz Contemporary Award

Established in 1998 and supported by the music composition promotional group Sounz, the Sounz Contemporary Award recognises works by New Zealand composers. The winner received a $3000 cash prize and a trophy designed by sculptor Sarah Smuts Kennedy.

APRA Maioha Award

Established in 2003, the APRA Maioha Award recognises contemporary Maori music. The winner receives a $3000 cash prize and is the annual guardian of award sculpture Te Ngore, crafted by sculptor Brian Flintoff.

APRA Screen Awards 

Established in 2014, the APRA Screen Awards consist of the APRA Best Original Music in a Feature Film Award and the APRA Best Original Music in a Series Award, celebrating the work of New Zealand's film composers. As of 2014, the winner of each award receives a $1500 cash prize and is the annual guardian of a trophy.

Most Performed New Zealand Work in New Zealand and Internationally

Between 1994 and 2015, APRA also awarded the New Zealand songs most played in New Zealand and around the world each year. While the national award was highly contested, from 2000 to 2012 the international award was dominated by Crowded House's 1986 song "Don't Dream It's Over".

New Zealand Music Hall of Fame

Created in 2007 in conjunction with the Recording Industry Association of New Zealand (RIANZ), the New Zealand Music Hall of Fame pays tribute to those who have "shaped, influenced and advanced popular music in New Zealand." Two musicians or groups are inducted into the hall each year, one at the APRA Silver Scroll Awards, decided by APRA, and the other is the winner of the Legacy Award at the New Zealand Music Awards (NZMAs), selected by RIANZ.

APRA Song Awards

Separate to the Silver Scroll awards, APRA recognises New Zealand songwriting in four specific genres.

APRA Best Country Music Song

Established in 2004, the APRA Best Country Music Song is presented as part of the NZ Country Music Awards at the annual Gold Guitar celebrations of New Zealand country music.

APRA Best Pacific Song

Established in 2005, the APRA Best Pacific Song award celebrates Pacific music. It is presented as part of the annual Pacific Music Awards.

APRA Best Maori Songwriter

Established in 2008, the APRA Best Maori Songwriter award celebrates Maori music. It is presented as part of the annual Waiata Maori Music Awards.

APRA Children's Song of the Year

Established in 2008, the APRA Best Children's Song award celebrates songwriters and composers who write for New Zealand children. APRA also sponsors the NZ On Air Best Children's Music Video award. The awards were previously presented at the annual StarFest event, as part of the annual KidsFest festival in Christchurch, then as of 2014 they were presented live on What Now and are now celebrated at an invite only music industry event in Auckland each NZ Music Month (May). The winning song wins a $10,000 special NZ On Air grant for producing new music and visual content, while the winning video receives a $500 prize.

APRA Best Jazz Composition

Established in 2016, the APRA Best Jazz Composition award recognises outstanding composition in jazz. The award is presented annually at the Wellington Jazz Festival.

APRA Professional Development Awards

The APRA Professional Development Awards were established in 2005 and are awarded biennially. Initially awarded to one recipient, from 2009 to 2019 three awards were given each round, recognising excellence in the fields of classical, pop contemporary, and film, television and video. Each recipient was awarded $12,000 cash to advance their careers through study or travel. Due to post-COVID circumstances, adjustments were made to the way the Professional Development Awards are distributed. Instead of $30,000 being split between three disciplines, six winners are chosen with each recipient receiving $5,000.

APRA Top 100 New Zealand Songs of All Time
In 2001, the APRA Top 100 New Zealand Songs of All Time was compiled by members of APRA to commemorate the organisation's 75th anniversary. The top 30 entries were used to create the Nature's Best compilation CD, with the rest of the list appearing in follow-up compilations. A similar list was made in Australia of the top 30 Australian songs.

References

External links

 
New Zealand music awards